Franck Horter (born 18 June 1967 in Mulhouse) is a French freestyle swimmer. He competed in one event at the 1992 Summer Olympics.

References

1967 births
Living people
French male freestyle swimmers
Olympic swimmers of France
Swimmers at the 1992 Summer Olympics
Sportspeople from Mulhouse
20th-century French people